Taylorville Station is a locality in the Australian state of South Australia located about  north-east of the Adelaide and about  to the north-west of the municipal seat of  Renmark.

The locality was established on 26 April 2013 in respect to “the long established local name.”  Its name is derived from the former pastoral lease of the same name with the addition of the word “Station” to distinguish it from the locality of Taylorville on the north bank of the Murray River 50 km southwest of Taylorville Station.

Taylorville Station is located within the federal divisions of Barker and Grey, the state electoral districts of Chaffey and Stuart, the state’s Murray and Mallee region, the Pastoral Unincorporated Area of South Australia and partly in the local government area of the District Council of Loxton Waikerie.

The land use within Taylorville Station is concerned with the following protected area which is also known as Taylorville Station and which has fully occupied its extent since its establishment in 2013.

See also
List of cities and towns in South Australia

References

Towns in South Australia
Riverland
Murray Mallee
Places in the unincorporated areas of South Australia